Janet Anderson (born March 10, 1956) is an American professional golfer.

Anderson was born in West Sunbury, Pennsylvania, United States.  She attended Slippery Rock Teacher's College. Her rookie year on the LPGA Tour was 1978. She achieved her only LPGA Tour victory in 1982 at one of the LPGA majors, the 1982 U.S. Women's Open. She also had her highest finish on the money list that year, placing 13th. Her last season on the tour was 1997.

Prior to her divorce in January 1983, Anderson played using her married name Janet Alex.

Professional wins

LPGA Tour wins (1)

Major championships

Wins (1)

References

External links

American female golfers
LPGA Tour golfers
Winners of LPGA major golf championships
Golfers from Pennsylvania
Slippery Rock University of Pennsylvania alumni
People from Butler County, Pennsylvania
1956 births
Living people
21st-century American women